Mondays Are Like Tuesdays and Tuesdays Are Like Wednesdays is the third studio album by Swedish indie pop band Acid House Kings. It was released on 19 August 2002 by Labrador Records and Hidden Agenda Records.

Track listing

Personnel
Credits for Mondays Are Like Tuesdays and Tuesdays Are Like Wednesdays adapted from album liner notes.

Acid House Kings
 Johan Angergård – bass, guitar, keyboards, production
 Niklas Angergård – vocals, guitar, keyboards, production
 Julia Lannerheim – vocals

Additional musicians
 Tobias Einestad – trumpet

Artwork and design
 Ballaleica.com – photography
 Lukas Möllersten – design

References

2002 albums
Acid House Kings albums
Labrador Records albums